Barpeta Lok Sabha constituency is one of the 14 Lok Sabha constituencies in Assam state in north-eastern India.

Assembly segments
Barpeta Lok Sabha constituency is composed of the following assembly segments:

Members of Parliament

Election results

2019

2014

References

See also
 Barpeta district
 List of Constituencies of the Lok Sabha

Lok Sabha constituencies in Assam
Barpeta district